Morshansk is a town in Tambov Oblast, Russia, located on the Tsna River (Oka's basin)  north of Tambov. Population:    44,000 (1970).

History
The exact origins of Morshansk are unknown; however, documents mention a populated place in this location since at least the 16th century. Formerly a village called Morsha, it was granted town status in 1779 by Catherine the Great because of its growth in relation to the fact that it was a major bread trading center on the Tsna River.

Administrative and municipal status
Within the framework of administrative divisions, Morshansk serves as the administrative center of Morshansky District, even though it is not a part of it. As an administrative division, it is incorporated separately as the town of oblast significance of Morshansk—an administrative unit with the status equal to that of the districts. As a municipal division, the town of oblast significance of Morshansk is incorporated as Morshansk Urban Okrug.

Notable people from Morshansk
 Nikolai Valentinov (1879–1964) Russian Marxist

References

Notes

Sources

External links
Website of Morshansk 

Cities and towns in Tambov Oblast
Morshansky Uyezd